Ticofurcilla is a genus of very small sea snails, marine gastropod mollusks or micromollusks in the family Cystiscidae.

Species
Species within the genus Ticofurcilla include:

 Ticofurcilla tica Espinosa & Ortea, 2002

References

 
Monotypic gastropod genera